QED were an Australian new wave trio, whose lead singer, Jenny Morris, went on to achieve commercial success as a solo artist. The band had a top twenty hit single, "Everywhere I Go", on the Australian Kent Music Report in 1984.

History

In February 1981 the New Zealand band The Crocodiles relocated to Sydney and soon disbanded. In late 1983, The Crocodiles' lead vocalist, Jenny Morris, formed QED in Sydney with guitarist Rex Goh (ex-Air Supply), bassist Ian Belton (ex-Dave Dobbyn, Renée Geyer), and drummer Shane Flew. The trio signed with EMI Australia and were produced by Mark Moffatt (The Saints, Mondo Rock, Tim Finn) and Ricky Fataar (Geyer, Finn, Kids in the Kitchen). QED recorded some of The Crocodiles' material including "Everywhere I Go", "Animal Magic" and "You're So Hip"; Morris also co-wrote new songs with Goh. 

Their debut single, "Everywhere I Go", was released in December 1983 and rose to No. 24 on the national chart in February 1984. After QED performed the song on Countdown on 1 April 1984, the single climbed back up the chart to peak at No. 19. In total, "Everywhere I Go" spent 16 weeks in the Australian Top 50 and was the 100th biggest-selling single of 1984. The follow-up single "Solo and More" was issued in March but was unsuccessful. The third single, "This One", appeared in August and reached No. 45 on the national singles chart. 

Additional musicians for QED's first album, Animal Magic, included keyboardist Amanda Vincent (Eurogliders, who later joined the Jenny Morris band), drummer Steve Fearnly, saxophonist Tony Buchanan, and Fataar on drums. EMI released the album in November 1984, but sales were low and it failed to chart. QED only released one album and disbanded by 1985. Morris continued session/touring work with other artists, Belton went on to join Mondo Rock, and Goh to Eurogliders. Morris later had a successful solo career.

Members
 Ian Belton – bass guitar
 Rex Goh – guitar
 Jenny Morris – vocals
 Shane Flew – drums

Additional personnel
 Tony Buchanan – saxophone
 Andy Burns – keyboards
 Ricky Fataar – drums
 Steve Fearnly – drums
 Shane Flew – guitar
 Martyn Irwin – keyboards
 Sam McNally – keyboards
 Glen Muirhead – keyboards
 Amanda Vincent – keyboards
 Warren Williams – bass

Discography

Albums

Singles

Awards and nominations

Countdown Music Awards
Countdown was an Australian pop music TV series on national broadcaster ABC-TV from 1974–1987, it presented music awards from 1979–1987, initially in conjunction with magazine TV Week. The TV Week / Countdown Awards were a combination of popular-voted and peer-voted awards.

|-
| 1984
| Animal Magic
| Best Debut Album
| 
|-

References

External links
 QED discography @ Discogs
 QED discography @ MusicBrainz
 QED archived from the original on 21 March 2013 at Australian Rock Database. Retrieved 4 March 2014

Musical groups from Sydney
Musical groups established in 1983
Musical groups disestablished in 1985
Australian new wave musical groups